is a passenger railway station located in the city of Amagasaki, Hyōgo Prefecture, Japan. It is operated by the private transportation company Hankyu Railway.

Lines

Layout
The station consists of two ground-level opposed side platforms, connect by both a footbridge and an underground passage.

Platforms

History 
Mukonosō Station opened on 20 October 1937.

Station numbering was introduced on 21 December 2013, with Mukonosō  being designated as station number HK-07.

Passenger statistics
In fiscal 2019, the station was used by an average of 39,375 passengers daily

Surrounding area
Nishimuko Park (Traffic park)
Amagasaki City North Library
Kansai Rosai Hospital
Kobe District Court Amagasaki Branch
College of Industrial Technorogy

Buses

Buses are operated by Hanshin Bus (Amagasaki City Line) .
North side
Bus stop 1
Route 45 for Muko-eigyosho via Mukonogo and Muko-motomachi
Route 46 for Muko-eigyosho via Mukonoso 3chome and Nishimuko
Bus stop 2
Route 40 for Miyanokita-danchi via Noma-nishi, Tokitomo and Joyo Junior High School
Route 41 for Miyanokita-danchi via Mukonogo, Muko Branch Office and Joyo Junior High School
Route 41-2 for Miyanokita-danchi via Mukonogo, Tomoyuki-nishiguchi and Joyo Junior High School
Bus stop 3
Route 48 for  via Kaminoshima, Tachibana Branch Office, Obamacho 2chome and Nishinagasu-hondori 2chome
Route 48-2 for  via Kaminoshima, Tachibana Branch Office and Obamacho 2chome
South side
Bus stop 4
Route 15 for  via , City Hall, Chuo Community Center and Higashinaniwacho 3chome
Route 47 for Mukogawa via JR Tachibana, Imakita, Nishi Fire Station and Ohsho-nishi
Route 47-2 for Mukogawa via JR Tachibana, Imakita, Rosai Hospital, Inabaso 1chome and Ohsho-nishi
Bus stop 5
Route 43,43-2 for Hanshin Amagasaki via Rosai Hospital, JR Tachibana, City Hall and Waterworks Bureau
Route 49 for  via Rosai Hospital, JR Tachibana, City Hall and Showadori 8chome
Bus stop 6
Route 43 for Miyanokita-danchi via Kinki Central Hospital, Noma-nishi, Tsunematsu and Nishikoya
Route 43-2 for  Muko-eigyosho via Kinki Central Hospital, Noma-nishi, Tsunematsu and Muko Branch Office
Route 47,47-2 for  Muko-eigyosho via Moribe Park and Nishimuko

See also
List of railway stations in Japan

References

External links

 Mukonosō Station website 

Railway stations in Japan opened in 1937
Railway stations in Hyōgo Prefecture
Hankyū Kōbe Main Line
Amagasaki